Stepan Savovych Baidiuk (born 28 November 1940) is a Ukrainian long-distance runner. He competed in the men's 5000 metres at the 1964 Summer Olympics, representing the Soviet Union.

References

1940 births
Living people
Athletes (track and field) at the 1964 Summer Olympics
Soviet male long-distance runners
Ukrainian male long-distance runners
Olympic athletes of the Soviet Union
Place of birth missing (living people)